Reipertswiller is a commune in the Bas-Rhin department in Grand Est in north-eastern France.

In 2019, Reipertswiller had 850 inhabitants. It is bordered on the North by Mouterhouse, on the Northeast by Baerenthal, on the Southeast by Lichtenberg, on the Southwest by Wimmenau and in the Northwest by Goetzenbruck.

The commune is part of the Parc naturel régional des Vosges du Nord.

See also
 Communes of the Bas-Rhin department

References

Communes of Bas-Rhin